Erhard (Eberhard) Ragwitz (born 1 September 1933) is a German musicologist, composer, and lecturer. From 1986 to 1989, he was the rector of the Hochschule für Musik "Hanns Eisler".

Life 
Ragwitz is from Königsberg, the capital of the Province of East Prussia. An autodidact, he learned to play the violin, bandoneon and piano in his childhood. He attended a school in Colditz, Saxony, where he founded an instrumental group and directed the choir. He was discovered by Fritz Reuter, who after the Abitur enabled him to study music. He later was a student of Ottmar Gerster.

In 1960, he became an assistant and aspirant (with Wilhelm Weismann), in 1964 a teacher and in 1968 a lecturer at the Hochschule für Musik in Leipzig. Temporarily, he also served as prorector for teaching and professional practice. From 1973, he taught at the Hochschule für Musik Hanns Eisler Berlin. From 1976 to 1978 he held the office of Prorektor der Hochschule. In 1978, he took over a professorship for composition. In 1981, he became head of the composition and composition department. As successor to Olaf Koch, he was appointed rector of the conservatoire on 19 September 1986. September 1986 as Rector of the Academy of Music in Berlin. Following a request by the Academy's Honorary Commission, he was dismissed in November 1989 by the Senate of Berlin for Science and Research.

Since the beginning of the 1960s, he has been composing orchestral, chamber and vocal music (cantatas, choral works, songs, arrangements). In 1981, the Deutsches Nationaltheater und Staatskapelle Weimar under Rolf Reuter premiered his 1st Symphony and in 1986 under Oleg Caetani his 2nd Symphony for the premiere.

From 1971 to 1974, Ragwitz, who was a member of the SED, served as a candidate for the SED-Bezirksleitung Leipzig. He is married to the music educator and cultural politician Ursula Ragwitz (born 1928).

Work 
Among others, Ragwitz composed the following pieces:

Orchestral music
 Festliche Ouvertüre (1965)
 Suite (1965)
 Drei Sätze für Streichorchester (1967)
 Divertimento für Streichorchester und Pauken (1968)
 Sinfonia intrada (1975)
 Divertimento für Trompete, Streichorchester und Pauke (1979)
 Sinfonie (1980)

Piano music
 Bagatellen (1961)
 4 Kleine Klavierstücke (1961)
 Intermezzo marcota (1974)
 2 Sonaten (1968, 1977)

Vocal music
 Song vom Klasseneinmaleins (Helmut Preißler, 1958)
 Lied vom Besserwissen (Helmut Preißler, 1958)
 Kantate der Freundschaft für Soli, Chor und Orchester (J. Wächtler, 1962)
 Zwei A-capella-Chöre (1963)
 Frühling der Jugend (Rose Nyland, 1964)
 Johann-Sebastian-Bach-Poem für Alt-Solo, Chor und Kammerorchester nach Johannes R. Becher (1970)
 Liederzyklus „Das lachende Herz“ mit Streichern und Klavier nach Texten von Johannes R. Becher (1979)

Recording 
 Sinfonie Nr. 1 op. 45 / Johann-Sebastian-Bach-Poem op. 28 / Drei Sätze für Streichorchester op. 22 (Nova, 1984) – Orchester der Komischen Oper Berlin and Rolf Reuter (coductor) / Rosemarie Lang (contralto), Rundfunkchor Leipzig, Collegium musicum Leipzig and Jochen Wehner (conductor) / Collegium musicum Leipzig und Jochen Wehner (conductor) – 1983 recording

Further reading 
 Gabriele Baumgartner: Ragwitz, Erhard. In Gabriele Baumgartner, Dieter Hebig (ed.): Biographisches Handbuch der SBZ/DDR. 1945–1990. Vol. 2: Maaßen–Zylla. Nachtrag zu Band 1, K. G. Saur, Munich 1997, .
 Günter Buch: Namen und Daten wichtiger Personen in der DDR. 4th, revised and expanded edition, Dietz, Berlin among others 1987, .
 Peter Hollfelder: Geschichte der Klaviermusik. Historische Entwicklungen, Komponisten mit Biographien und Werkverzeichnissen, nationale Schulen. Vol. 1, Noetzel, Wilhelmshaven 1989, .

References

External links 
 
 
 Erhard Ragwitz at 

20th-century classical composers
Academic staff of the University of Music and Theatre Leipzig
20th-century German musicologists
German classical composers
Socialist Unity Party of Germany members
1933 births
Living people
Musicians from Königsberg